Frank Whitehead may refer to:
 Frank Whitehead (Canadian politician)
 Frank Whitehead (American politician)